Hüntwangen is a municipality in the district of Bülach in the canton of Zürich in Switzerland.

History
Hüntwangen is first mentioned in 1254 as Hiuntwangin.

Geography
Of this area, 50.9% is used for agricultural purposes, while 32.9% is forested. Of the rest of the land, 13.6% is settled (buildings or roads) and the remainder (2.6%) is non-productive (rivers, glaciers or mountains).

The municipality is located on the western edge of the Rafzerfeld, the region in the district which is north of the Rhine.

Demographics
, 7.4% of the population was made up of foreign nationals. Over the last 10 years the population has grown at a rate of 22.9%. Most of the population speaks German  (96.8%), with Italian being second most common ( 0.8%) and French being third ( 0.5%).

In the 2007 election the most popular party was the SVP which received 42.8% of the vote.  The next three most popular parties were the SPS (17%), the FDP (11.2%) and the Green Party (8.9%).

The age distribution of the population is children and teenagers (0–19 years old) make up 24.3% of the population, while adults (20–64 years old) make up 63.2% and seniors (over 64 years old) make up 12.5%. In Hüntwangen about 85.5% of the population (between age 25–64) have completed either non-mandatory upper secondary education or additional higher education (either university or a Fachhochschule).

Hüntwangen has an unemployment rate of 1.61%.  , there were 34 people employed in the primary economic sector and about 13 businesses involved in this sector.  65 people are employed in the secondary sector and there are 8 businesses in this sector.  92 people are employed in the tertiary sector, with 26 businesses in this sector.

The historical population is given in the following table:

Transport 
Hüntwangen-Wil railway station is a stop of the Zürich S-Bahn on the line S9. It is a 33-minute ride from Zürich Hauptbahnhof.

References

External links 

  
 

Municipalities of the canton of Zürich